Timothy "Tim" A. Springer, Ph.D. is an immunologist and Latham Family Professor at Harvard Medical School. Springer is best known for his pioneering work in discovering the first integrins  and intercellular adhesion molecules (ICAMs)  and elucidating how these cell adhesion molecules function in the immune system. His innovative use of monoclonal antibodies in his research paved the way for the development of therapeutic antibodies, known as selective adhesion molecule inhibitors, to treat autoimmune diseases. In recent years, Springer's research interest has expanded to include malaria, transforming growth factor beta (TGF-β) signaling molecules, and von Willebrand factor.

Education and training
Springer attended the University of California, Berkeley, where he majored in biochemistry. After graduating Phi Beta Kappa with Distinction and the Departmental Citation, he went on to do his Ph.D. in the lab of Jack Strominger at Harvard University. Following his graduate work, Springer received his postdoctoral training under the guidance of César Milstein at the University of Cambridge.

Research focus
His lab elucidated different steps in the homing process of lymphocytes with a special focus on the integrin LFA-1. His research encompasses the cell adhesion molecules and chemotactic signals involved in lymphocyte migration in health and disease.

Business career 
When Moderna Therapeutics launched its IPO in December 2018, Springer became the company's fourth-largest shareholder and made $400 million, after investing $5 million in the startup early on. Earlier, he had made around $100 million on his first venture LeukoSite, which in 1999 had been bought by Millennium Pharmaceuticals. Springer is also a founder of biotechnology companies Morphic Therapeutic and Scholar Rock.  He is also a main investor in Selecta Biosciences. During the coronavirus pandemic crisis, Springer became a billionaire boosting his net worth to more than $1 billion after shares of biotech surge. He has a stake in Moderna Inc, the U.S biotech firm which developed a vaccine for the SARS-CoV-2 virus.

Philanthropy 
In 2017, Springer co-founded the Institute for Protein Innovation (IPI), a 501(c)(3) nonprofit organization, with Springer providing a $10 million foundational grant.  Springer has also endowed chairs at Boston Children's Hospital, at Berkeley in honor of Professor Jack Kirsch, and at Harvard in honor of his parents, Asa and Patricia Springer.

Awards
 1993 - American Heart Association Basic Research Prize
 1995 - Cancer Research Institute William B. Coley Award
 1996 - Member, National Academy of Sciences
 2001 - Fellow, American Academy of Arts and Sciences  
 2004 - Crafoord Prize
 2004 - Guggenheim Fellowship
 2013 - AAAS Fellow
 2014 - AAI-Life Technologies Meritorious Career Award, American Association of Immunologists
 2014 - Henry M. Stratton Medal American Society of Hematology
 2019 - Canada Gairdner International Award
 2022 - Albert Lasker Award for Basic Medical Research.

Selected publications

References

Harvard University faculty
1948 births
Living people
Fellows of the American Academy of Arts and Sciences
Fellows of the American Association for the Advancement of Science
Members of the United States National Academy of Sciences
Recipients of the Albert Lasker Award for Basic Medical Research
American billionaires
American immunologists
Harvard Medical School alumni
Harvard University alumni
UC Berkeley College of Letters and Science alumni
University of California, Berkeley alumni
Moderna people